José Ángel Hernández (born 17 September 1975) is a Mexican professional boxer. He has held the NABA, NABF and International Boxing Association Americas light middleweight titles.

Professional career
Hernandez made his professional boxing debut at age 16 on March 29, 1996 with a first-round KO victory over David Pearson. He won his first eight fights by knockout.

Hernandez was 13-0 before being defeated by Puerto Rican boxer Wilfredo Rivera.

On May 13, 2000, Hernandez won the  IBA Americas Jr. Middleweight Title with a twelve-round split decision over Dominican Republic's Julio Cesar De la Cruz.

On July 28, 2002, Hernandez defeated Larry Marks for the  vacant NABF light middleweight title by split decision.

Hernandez vs. Ouma
On May 30, 2003, Kassim Ouma defeated 'El Toro' by split decision in an IBF Light Middleweight Title Eliminator for the vacant USBA light middleweight title.

Hernandez vs. Winky Wright
On November 8, 2003, Hernandez (26-4) lost a 12-round unanimous decision to previous IBF light middleweight champion Winky Wright, (45-3). Winky became the new IBF light middleweight champion in the co-event fight at the Mandalay Bay Resort and Casino, Las Vegas.

Hernandez vs. Joval
On February 6, 2004, 'El Toro' moved up in weight and fought Raymond Joval of Netherlands at Desert Diamond Casino, Tucson, Arizona, United States. Joval won a technical decision in the eighth round.

Hernandez vs. Manfredo Jr.
On May 22, 2010, Hernandez lost his attempt to win the International Boxing Organization's vacant middleweight title against The Contender's Peter Manfredo, Jr. by tenth round stoppage.

Hernandez vs. Adama
On December 17, 2010, Hernandez lost his second shot at a middleweight championship for the vacant IBO international title at UIC Pavilion in Chicago, Illinois to ex-Olympian Osumanu Adama of Ghana by a twelve round unanimous decision.

Hernandez Disqualification Loss to Joey Hernandez

On March 25, 2011, Hernandez incurred an eighth round disqualification loss to Joey Hernandez, in a bout for the vacant USBO Light Middleweight title. Hernandez was briefly suspended, but was subsequently reinstated. He was relicensed to box by the Illinois Athletic Commission in 2012.

Hernandez versus Demetrius Andrade

Hernandez failed in an attempted comeback on February 10, 2012, in the main event of a Mohegan Sun Casino seven bout boxing card against 15-0 ex-Olympian Demetrius Andrade in a bout for the vacant IBA Americas light middleweight title. Andrade knocked out Hernandez at 1:39 of the second round. Hernandez, who passed all required medical tests before the bout, was suspended for 90 days.

References

External links
 
 http://www.boxing360.com/fighters/angel_hernandez.php

1975 births
Boxers from San Luis Potosí
Middleweight boxers
Living people
People from San Luis Potosí City
Mexican male boxers